Badminton Scotland is the governing body for the sport of badminton in Scotland.  It aims to govern, encourage and develop the sport for all throughout the country. Established in 1911 as the Scottish Badminton Union, it is affiliated to the Badminton World Federation and the Badminton Europe.

Presidents
Badminton Scotland organizes the annual Scottish Open, which has been held since 1907. Following table lists the presidents who have served in the organization since 1911.

References

External links

Badminton in Scotland
Sports governing bodies in Scotland
1911 establishments in Scotland
1911 in British sport
Organisations based in Glasgow
Sport in Glasgow
Scotland